Riber Castle is a 19th-century Grade II listed country house in the hamlet of Riber on a hill overlooking Matlock, Derbyshire. It is built of gritstone from a local quarry which was pulled up the  hill by a series of pulleys.

History
Known locally as "Smedley's Folly" because of the difficulty of getting water to the hill summit, it was built by the industrialist John Smedley in 1862 as his private home. His wife lived in it until her death in 1892. After the death of Smedley's wife, the castle became a boys' prep school until this became financially unsustainable in the 1930s. The architectural historian John Summerson attended the school in the early 20th century. While he enjoyed his time at the school, the building's architecture had lesser appeal; he described the castle as "an object of indecipherable bastardy – a true monster". With the coming of World War II the Ministry of Defence used the site for food storage. The MoD left following the war and the castle remained unused until the 1960s.

From the 1960s to September 2000 it was home to a wildlife park, containing British and European fauna. Riber Castle Wildlife Park, or Riber Zoo as it was known, was eventually sold by the owner. The original owners sold the wildlife Park as a going concern. The subsequent owners were criticised heavily for the treatment of the animals kept there, and the closure was not without controversy. The original owners bred lynx which were later released in a European mountain range.

Plans to turn the shell into apartments received planning consent on 15 March 2006. The castle walls have now been secured, chimneys and floors rebuilt, 119 windows replaced and a roof added. It was expected that two show apartments would be ready some time in 2014. Access to the site before 2006 was securely restricted, until the perimeter fence was unwired to provide unrestricted access to the site, which later became a commonly used footpath. However, recently developers have added a second (more secure) fence, boarded up all entrance points and have security personnel onsite.

In popular culture
The castle and the town of Matlock are key locations in the Shane Meadows film Dead Man's Shoes.

See also
Listed buildings in Matlock Town

References

Sources

External links 

 Andrews Gen

Grade II listed buildings in Derbyshire
Country houses in Derbyshire
Ruins in Derbyshire
Mock castles in England
Ruined castles in England
Buildings and structures completed in 1862
1862 establishments in England
Matlock, Derbyshire